Nepal Engineering Council is an autonomous government body formed in 11 March, 1999 under The Nepal Engineering Council Act. The council was established in order to mobilize the engineering profession in a systematic and scientific manner by making it effective, as well as to make provision for, among other matters, the registration of the names of engineers as per their qualifications. 

The council used to register engineers based on academic certificates until 2022. An amendment bill was registered in the parliament in June 2019 and was passed in August 2022 which makes mandatory to take exams from the council to get license. As of 2022, there are 37 engineering field for which license are issued.

Councilors
Nepal Engineering Council has 18 Councilors as follows:
Chairman appointed by the government of Nepal
Vice Chairman appointed by the government of Nepal
Five engineers appointed by the government of Nepal
President of Nepal Engineers Association 
Five engineers elected from Nepal Engineering Association
One representative from Institute of Engineering, Tribhuvan University
One campus chief from various engineering colleges
Registrar
Two members elected by the council

Jurisdiction of Council 

 Licensing (Registration) of Engineers
 Accreditation of certificates of academic qualifications
 Recognition of the academic institutions
 Professional code of conduct

Registration Category 
The council has provision to register Engineers in three categories:

 General Engineer ( Category - A )
 Professional Engineer ( Category - B )
 Foreign Engineer ( Category - C )

See also
Nepal Bar Council
Nepal Medical Council

References

External links

Education in Nepal
Organisations based in Nepal
Regulatory agencies of Nepal
1999 establishments in Nepal
Engineering organizations in Nepal